Thomas Burgstaller (born 9 January 1980) is an Austrian professional association football player currently playing for SC Schwaz. He plays as a defender.

External links

1980 births
Living people
Austrian footballers
Association football defenders
SK Rapid Wien players
SV Ried players
FC Lustenau players
SK Sturm Graz players
Kapfenberger SV players
Austrian Football Bundesliga players